Countess Victoria Bernstorff-Gyldensteen is a former lady-in-waiting of the Danish Royal Family of Mary, Crown Princess of Denmark.

References

Living people
Danish nobility
American people of Danish descent
Year of birth missing (living people)
Danish ladies-in-waiting